James Orvis Berger (born April 6, 1950 in Minneapolis, Minnesota) is an American statistician best known for his work on Bayesian statistics and decision theory. He won the COPSS Presidents' Award, one of the two highest awards in statistics, in 1985 at the age of 35. He received a Ph.D. in mathematics from Cornell University in 1974. He was a faculty member in the Department of Statistics at Purdue University until 1997, at which time he moved to the Institute of Statistics and Decision Sciences (now the Department of Statistical Science) at Duke University, where he is currently the Arts and Sciences Professor of Statistics. He was also Director of the Statistical and Applied Mathematical Sciences Institute from 2002-2010, and has been a Visiting Professor at the University of Chicago since 2011.

Contributions to science 
Berger has worked on the decision theoretic bases of Bayesian inference, including advances on the Stein phenomenon during and after his thesis. He has also greatly contributed to advances in the so-called objective Bayes approach where prior distributions are constructed from the structure of the sampling distributions and/or of frequentist properties. He is also recognized for his analysis of the opposition between Bayesian and frequentist visions on testing statistical hypotheses, with criticisms of the use of p-values and critical levels.

Awards and honors 
Berger has received numerous awards for his work: Guggenheim Fellowship, the COPSS Presidents' Award and the R. A. Fisher Lectureship. He was elected as a Fellow of the American Statistical Association and to the National Academy of Sciences in 2003. In 2004, he was awarded an honorary Doctor of Science degree by Purdue University.

Bibliography

References

External links 
 

Duke University faculty
American statisticians
Fellows of the American Statistical Association
Members of the United States National Academy of Sciences
Presidents of the Institute of Mathematical Statistics
Cornell University alumni
Living people
1950 births
Scientists from Minneapolis
Annals of Statistics editors
Mathematical statisticians